The Diocese of Kochi is a diocese of the Malankara Orthodox Syrian Church. The diocese was created after the Mulanthuruthy Synod in 1876. Yakob Mar Irenios is the Metropoliton of the diocese. The head office is located in Zion Seminary, Korratti East, Chalakkudi.

History

Kochi is one of seven dioceses created after the Mulanthuruthi Christian association (synod) conducted under the leadership of Ignatios Pathros III, Patriarch of Antioch in 1876. Others are Kottayam, Kandanadu, Angamali, Niranam, Kollam, Thumpamon. The diocese was created with 21 parishes in Kochi State and British Malabar. Semavun Mar Dionysius was the first Metropolitan. Dionysious V, Dionysious VI, Poulose Mar Athanasios, Poulose Mar Severios, Daniel Mar Pilexinos, Yuhanon Mar Severios, Yakob Mar Policurpos etc. led the diocese in different times.  Baselios Geevarghese I, Baselios Augen I, Baselios Mar Thoma Mathews I also led the diocese.
Maliankara, Paloor, Kokamangalam, Kottakayal, churches founded by St. Thomas is situated in this diocese. Dionysious II, Dionysius V, Parumala Thirumeni came from this diocese.
Later, the diocese divided into the Malabar and Kunnamkulam dioceses. The tombs of Yuhanon Mar Severios, Yakob Mar Policurpos are in the Zion Aramana. In the time of 1992, there were 38 parishes and eight chapels.

Parish list

1) Areepalam St. Mary's Orthodox Church

2) Ayyampilly St. John's Orthodox Church

3) Chalakkudy St. Thomas Orthodox Church

4) Chembukkavu St. Thomas Orthodox Church

5) Cherai St. Mary's Orthodox Church

6) Chuvanammanu St. George Orthodox Church

7) Elamkulam St. Gregorios Orthodox Church

8) Ernakulam St. Mary's Orthodox Cathedral

9) Fort Kochi St. Peter and Paul's Orthodox Church

10) Irinjalakkuda St. Mary's Orthodox Church

11) Kanaikode St. Mary's Orthodox Church

12) Kanjiramattom St. Ignatious Orthodox Church

13) Kannara St. George Orthodox Church

14) Karippakkunnu Mar Baselios Orthodox Church

15) Kattilappoovam St. Mary's Orthodox Church

16) Koratty St. Kuriakose Orthodox Church

17) Mattancherry St. George Orthodox Koonankurishu pali

18) Manthuruthe St. John the Baptist Orthodox Church

19) Mulumthurthy Marthoman Cathedral

20) Marackal St. George Orthodox Church

21) Murikkungal St. Mary's Orthodox Church

22) Nehru Nagar St. Gregorios Orthodox Church

23) Padamugal St. John the Baptist Orthodox Church

24) Palarivattom St. George Orthodox Valiyapali

25) Pengamuck St. Peter's and St. Paul's Orthodox Church

26) Poolakkal St. George Orthodox Church

27) Thampurattimoola St. Mary's Orthodox Church

28) Thevara St. Thomas Orthodox Church

29) Thenidukku Mar Gregorios Orthodox Church

30) Thirumarayur St. George Orthodox Church

31) Thripunithara St. Gregorios Orthodox Church

32) Thrissur St. Ignatious Orthodox Cathedral

33) Vadavukode St. Mary's Orthodox Church

34) Vadayamparambu Mar Behanan Orthodox Church

35) Vaniyampara St. George Orthodox Church

36) Vattayi St. Mary's Orthodox Church

37) Vyttila St. Gregorios Orthodox Church

38) Chavarmpadom St. George Orthodox Church

References

External links
Website of Malankara Orthodox Church

Malankara Orthodox Syrian Church dioceses
1876 establishments in India